The Mayor of the City of Waco is the official head of the city of Waco in the U.S. state of Texas.

References

Mayors of Waco, Texas
Waco